The National Catholic Student Coalition is an organization made up of Catholic Campus Ministry groups at colleges or universities throughout the United States.

Partners
The National Catholic Student Coalition is a partner with regional, national, and international associations whose missions are aligned with its own.  Its partners include:

 Catholic Campus Ministry Association (CCMA)
 National Association of Diocesan Directors of Campus Ministry (NADDCM)
 United States Conference of Catholic Bishops (USCCB)
 International Movement of Catholic Students (IMCS) - Pax Romana
 International Young Catholic Students (IYCS)
 Catholic Movement for Intellectual and Cultural Affairs (CMICA) - Pax Romana
 Catholic Movement for Intellectual and Cultural Affairs (CMICA) USA - Pax Romana

Regions
The NCSC is divided into four regions.  The West, Midwest, South, and Northeast.  Each region has a color associated with it, those being yellow, blue, green, and red respectively.  Each region has its own leadership team, headed by a regional chairperson who reports to the national team.

Catholic student organizations